Laurence Olivier Presents is a British television anthology series made by Granada Television which ran from 1976 to 1978.

The plays, with the exception of Hindle Wakes, all starred Laurence Olivier. Some of the plays were based on productions staged at the National Theatre during the period when Olivier was Artistic Director. In addition to distinguished English actors, the casts assembled for these productions included several Hollywood stars, such as Natalie Wood, Robert Wagner, Joanne Woodward and Maureen Stapleton.

The individual plays adapted for television were: 
 Cat on a Hot Tin Roof by Tennessee Williams
 The Collection by Harold Pinter
 Hindle Wakes by Stanley Houghton
 Come Back, Little Sheba by William Inge
 Daphne Laureola by James Bridie
 Saturday, Sunday, Monday by Eduardo De Filippo.

DVD
The series was also released by Acorn Media in September 2006 as a 6-DVD set with the same title, with The Ebony Tower, adapted from John Fowles' novella by John Mortimer, replacing Daphne Laureola .

The complete series was re-released by Network Media individually and as part of The Laurence Olivier Centenary Collection along with The Ebony Tower.

External links 
 

1976 British television series debuts
1978 British television series endings
1970s British drama television series
Television series by ITV Studios
Television shows produced by Granada Television
ITV television dramas
English-language television shows
Laurence Olivier